Southcott, formerly also Southcote, is a hamlet north of Dartmoor in the parish of Winkleigh in the district of Torridge, Devon, England.

Historically the hamlet began as a manor house and farm houses, the ancient and former seat of the Southcott family.

References

External links 

Hamlets in Devon
Torridge District
Southcott family